Frederick Trainer (born 5 March 1941) is an Australian gymnast. He competed in eight events at the 1964 Summer Olympics.

References

1941 births
Living people
Australian male artistic gymnasts
Olympic gymnasts of Australia
Gymnasts at the 1964 Summer Olympics
Place of birth missing (living people)